Jinwi Station is a station on Seoul Subway Line 1 in the city of Pyeongtaek, South Korea. Services on the Gyeongbu Line also pass through at this station.

References

Seoul Metropolitan Subway stations
Railway stations opened in 2006
Metro stations in Pyeongtaek